The Salvation Army Women's Home and Hospital, now The Salvation Army's Booth Brown House, is a 1912 brick Tudor Revival style building designed by Clarence H. Johnston, Sr. in Saint Paul, Minnesota, United States. The Salvation Army originally used it to provide housing and hospital care for unwed mothers and their children.  In 1971 its focus changed to helping young women with behavioral or emotional issues.  The facility now serves homeless and transitional youth.  The building was listed on the National Register of Historic Places on February 10, 1983 for its architecture and its significance in religion, humanitarianism, and women's history.

References

External links
 The Salvation Army's Booth Brown House

Residential buildings completed in 1912
Hospital buildings completed in 1912
Hospital buildings on the National Register of Historic Places in Minnesota
National Register of Historic Places in Saint Paul, Minnesota
Residential buildings on the National Register of Historic Places in Minnesota
Salvation Army buildings
Women's hospitals
Tudor Revival architecture in Minnesota
Salvationism in the United States
1912 establishments in Minnesota
History of women in Minnesota